Mystery of the River Boat is a 1944 Universal movie serial directed by Lewis D. Collins and Ray Taylor. It co-starred Lyle Talbot, Robert Lowery and Mantan Moreland.

Cast
 Robert Lowery as Steve Langtry
 Eddie Quillan as Jug Jenks
 Marion Martin as Celeste Eltree, river boat singer
 Marjorie Clements as Jenny Perrin, Captain Perrin's daughter
 Lyle Talbot as Rudolph Toller, foreign agent
 Arthur Hohl as Clayton
 Oscar O'Shea as Captain Ethan Perrin, captain of the river boat The Morning Glory
 Francis McDonald as Batiste
 Mantan Moreland as Napoleon, ship steward
 Eddy Waller as Charles Langtry
 Ian Wolfe as Herman Einreich, villainous land speculator
 Byron Foulger as Dr. H. Hartman
 Earle Hodgins as Jean Duval
 Anthony Warde as Bruno Bloch
 Alec Craig as the Chief Engineer

Production

Stunts
 John Daheim doubling Robert Lowery
 Carey Loftin doubling Robert Lowery
 Eddie Parker doubling Dick Curtis
 Tom Steele doubling Arthur Hohl

Critical reception
Cline considers this to be an average serial but one with a good cast and all the necessary "ingredients" of a good serial.

Chapter titles
 The Tragic Crash
 The Phantom Killer
 The Flaming Inferno
 The Brink of Doom
 The Highway of Peril
 The Fatal Plunge
 The Toll of the Storm
 The Break in the Levee
 Trapped in the Quicksands
 Flaming Havoc
 Electrocuted
 Risking Death
 The Boomerang
Source:

See also
 List of film serials by year
 List of film serials by studio

References

External links

1944 films
American mystery films
American black-and-white films
1940s English-language films
Universal Pictures film serials
Films directed by Ray Taylor
Films directed by Lewis D. Collins
Articles containing video clips
1944 mystery films
Films scored by Paul Sawtell
1940s American films